The City Law School is one of the five schools of City, University of London. In 2001, the Inns of Court School of Law became part of City, and is now known as the City Law School. Until 1997, the ICSL had a monopoly on the provision of the Bar Vocational Course (BVC; formerly known as the Bar Professional Training Course, or BPTC, and now known as Bar Vocational Studies, or BVS), the obligatory professional training for would-be barristers in England and Wales, before they commence pupillage.

The School was previously divided into two sections across two campuses; the academic instruction section is based in the Gloucester Building, next to the university's main campus on Northampton Square and Grays Inn Place, where the professional legal training programmes were based. From September 2021, a new building for the City Law School was developed close to the main campus. 
The City Law School provides legal education at all stages, including a three-year undergraduate Bachelor of Laws (LLB) programme, a two-year Graduate Entry LLB degree programme, the Master of Laws (LLM) and the Graduate Diploma in Law (GDL) course (formerly known as the Common Professional Examination). The latter programme enjoys a nationwide reputation as one of Britain's elite qualifying diploma courses for non-law graduates. The School also teaches the Legal Practice Course (LPC) for would-be solicitors. In 2007, it received the highest grading from the Law Society of England and Wales for its academic provision.

Approximately 1600 students are enrolled at the City Law School each year.

History
The Inns of Court School of Law (often abbreviated as ICSL) was founded by the Council of Legal Education in 1852. It was a professional legal training institution based for 100 years at Lincoln's Inn and then at Gray's Inn in London. Until 1997, the ICSL had a monopoly on the provision of the Bar Vocational Course (now the Bar Professional Training Course), the obligatory, pre-pupillage training course for intending barristers in England and Wales. Before that time the Inns of Court were responsible for the education of those intending to become barristers. There was call during the nineteenth century for the education of barristers to be unified and thus the Council of Legal Education was formed and ICSL founded. Since 2001 the ICSL has been part of City, University of London.

The Council of Legal Education (CLE) was established by Resolutions of the Inns of Court in 1852. The CLE initially met in the library of Lincoln's Inn. In 1903 it moved to 15 Old Square, Lincoln's Inn. In 1947, the CLE moved to 7 Stone Buildings, where it was able to provide lecture rooms, and other facilities for students. In 1964, the CLE acquired premises in Gray's Inn. In 1967, the Inns of Court School of Law (ICSL) was formally established on the current site, 4 Gray's Inn Place. The first dean, Charles Morrison, was appointed in 1969.

As well as the site at 4 Gray's Inn Place, the ICSL also acquired the Atkin Building in Gray's Inn and a building in Princeton Street - formerly the London studios of Yorkshire Television.

Although the name "Inns of Court School of Law" is no longer used, the location and traditions of the original institution remain unchanged.

When the ICSL was first created, each of the four Inns of Court were required to provide two rooms for teaching purposes. Until just after the Second World War, the ICSL was located in Lincoln's Inn. In the 1950s, a purpose-built building was constructed at 4, Gray's Inn Place (within Gray's Inn) and the school relocated there. Shortly after that, Atkin Building in Gray's Inn was secured and then in the 1980s a further building was acquired for the ICSL in Princeton Street, formerly the London studios of Yorkshire Television.

Rebranding
In July 2008, the ICSL brand was dropped and replaced with the City Law School brand. Replacement of the ICSL brand was phased in gradually. Initially, both logos were used on the school stationery. In the 2007–2008 academic year, school publications bore The City Law School name with the ICSL logo. Now, The City Law School logo is used exclusively.

Many students, legal professionals and Inns of Court School of Law alumni still refer to City Law School as the "Inns of Court School of Law".

ICSL Coat of Arms
The ICSL Coat of Arms, used to be displayed at the front entrance to Gray's Inn Place. The Arms consisted of the joint Coats of Arms of all four Inns of Court, namely (in order) Lincoln's Inn, the Middle Temple, the Inner Temple and Gray's Inn. The Council of Legal Education used a similar form of the Arms.

Academic courses
The School teaches the Graduate Diploma in Law (GDL) for graduates who wish to qualify as a lawyer without a law degree. The diploma has a strong reputation, and boasts an array of visiting lecturers, many of whom are leading academics in legal education.

The School also offers the Graduate Entry LLB (Hons); a senior status law degree which allows non-law graduates to achieve an LLB law degree in just two years rather than the usual three.

The School also offers an undergraduate LLB three year degree.

The City Law Society is a student led society at City, University of London, that caters for social & professional events aimed at both Law and non-Law students. It is one of the largest societies at City Students' Union.

They have organised workshops for students, career opportunities, seminars, the latest news and advice. They are committed to running events relating to student skill development and employability. The Law Society also runs social events that give student the chance to meet and socialise with fellow students interested in the Law, and above all make the experience of developing your intellectual capacities all the more enjoyable. As such the City Law Society hosts an annual Law ball which is attended by over 200 students of City, University of London. The City Law Society also runs an annual City Law School Journal (that was founded by students).

Professional courses
The School teaches the Bar Vocational Studies (BVS), formerly known as the Bar Professional Training Course (BPTC) for intending barristers and the Legal Practice Course (LPC) for intending solicitors.  In 2007, it received the highest grading from the Law Society of England and Wales. The School also provides a range of Continuing Professional Development (CPD) courses and a Master of Laws (LLM) programme.

Students who successfully complete the BVS or LPC are awarded a Postgraduate Diploma. The City Law School provides both BVS and LPC students with the ability to apply for an LL.M. degree with an additional dissertation to be completed over the summer.

Campus
From September 2021, law students will be taught from the new law building which features a mock court room, a dedicated law library, student study spaces and Advocacy Recording rooms.

BPTC Association
The purpose of the BPTC Association is to provide parties and social activities for those students at The City Law School reading for the Bar. The School provides the BPTC Association with funds for the purpose of undertaking this task. All BPTC students are automatically members of the BPTC Association. The Committee Officers are the President, Vice President, Social Secretary and Treasurer, all of which are elected by the BPTC students.

Notable people and alumni

Alumni include many judges, King's Counsel, and distinguished academics. Others who went on to achieve the highest distinction include Mohandas Karamchand Gandhi (leader of the Indian Independence Movement), Muhammad Ali Jinnah (first Governor General and founder of Pakistan), four British Prime Ministers – Tony Blair, Margaret Thatcher, Clement Attlee and H. H. Asquith, and Nana Akufo-Addo, Kwame Nkrumah 1st president of Ghana.

The current Dean of The City Law School is Professor Andrew Stockley who started in November 2018.

References

External links

1852 establishments in England
City, University of London
Education in London
Law schools in England
Professional education in London
Educational institutions established in 1852